The Heist is the debut studio album by American hip hop duo Macklemore & Ryan Lewis. It was released on October 9, 2012, by Macklemore LLC, distributed under the Alternative Distribution Alliance. The album was independently self-produced, self-recorded and self-released by the duo, with no mainstream promotion or support. After the album's release, the duo hired Warner Music Group's radio promotion department to help the push with their singles for a small percentage of the sales.

The album was recorded in Seattle, Washington between 2009 and 2012. Within each series of singles were released, before the album release from 2010 and onwards; the fourth single "Thrift Shop", which was the most commercially successful – peaking at number one on the Billboard Hot 100, number one in 17 other countries, including number one positions in New Zealand and Australia, as well as a successful run on the charts in many other countries. The album's second single "Can't Hold Us" was also largely commercially successful, peaking at number one in the United States, Australia, and Sweden.

The album sold 78,000 copies in its first week, debuting at number two on the Billboard 200, and at number one on the Billboard Top R&B/Hip-Hop Albums, while entering the Canadian Albums Chart at number four. The album received generally positive reviews from critics. On January 26, 2014, it won the Grammy Award for Best Rap Album, where it was also nominated for Album of the Year and earned Macklemore and Ryan Lewis the award for Best New Artist. As of early 2016, the album has sold 1,490,000 copies in the United States.

Background 
In July 2012, Macklemore and Ryan Lewis announced that their full-length debut album will be titled The Heist, and it would be released on October 9, 2012, as well as a subsequent world tour to promote the release. On July 18, 2012, the duo released the Mary Lambert-assisted single "Same Love," in support of Washington state's Referendum 74 regarding gay marriage. It was announced that the song would be included on the album, as were previously released singles "Wings" and "Can't Hold Us." In an interview with The Sermon's Domain, Macklemore confirmed a collaboration with Schoolboy Q on a song about Cadillacs called "White Walls." The song titled "Jimmy Iovine" featuring Ab-Soul was also confirmed. On September 4, 2012, Macklemore and Ryan Lewis released a video promoting the deluxe edition of The Heist, showing it as a box made out of faux-gator skin.

Singles 
The official debut single, "Wings" was released on January 21, 2011. It was produced by Ryan Lewis. The song reached at number 40 on the Hot R&B/Hip-Hop Songs, and number 12 on the Billboards Bubbling Under Hot 100 Singles chart.

The album's second single, "Can't Hold Us" featuring Ray Dalton, was released on August 16, 2011. The track eventually caught the attention of Sean Lynch, a writer from The Source; who initiated an interview to land Macklemore in the magazine's "Unsigned Hype" column in 2012. It debuted on the Billboard Hot 100 at number 97 for the week ending on February 16, 2013, and peaked at number one on the week of May 18, 2013, and remained there for 5 consecutive weeks, becoming the longest running consecutive number-one of 2013, tied with Harlem Shake by Baauer (although both were later bested by Robin Thicke's "Blurred Lines", which remained atop the chart for 12 consecutive weeks). It also peaked at number one on the Hot R&B/Hip-Hop Songs chart. It as well reached at number one in Australia and Belgium.

The album's third single, "Same Love" featuring Mary Lambert, was released on July 18, 2012, and gained significant coverage in the media due to its content supporting same-sex marriage and criticizing homophobia in hip hop culture. "Same Love" debuted at number 99 on the Billboard Hot 100 chart for the week ending February 16, 2013, and peaked at number 11. The single reached number one in Australia in the ARIA Charts and on New Zealand's RIANZ chart.

The album's fourth single, "Thrift Shop" featuring Wanz, was very successful commercially. It was released on August 27, 2012, and peaked on the Billboard Hot 100 at number one for six non-consecutive weeks. "Thrift Shop" has sold over 6 million copies in the United States. "Thrift Shop" also reached the top of the Australian and New Zealand singles charts and was certified 6× Platinum in Australia and 2× Platinum in New Zealand. In Canada, it reached at number one on the Canadian Hot 100. The single has also become a veritable international hit, charting in many European singles charts; including Austria, Denmark, France, Finland, Germany, Norway, The Netherlands, Sweden and the United Kingdom.

The album's fifth single, "White Walls" featuring guest vocals from fellow rapper Schoolboy Q and singer Hollis, which they was performed the song on The Tonight Show with Jay Leno on August 27, 2013. It was officially released to mainstream radio on October 8, 2013. The song has since peaked at number 15 on the Billboard Hot 100

Promotional singles
"My Oh My" was released as the album's promotional single on December 21, 2010. The song was included as a bonus track on the album.

Critical reception 

The Heist received generally positive reviews from critics. At Metacritic, which assigns a normalized rating out of 100 to reviews from mainstream publications, the album received an average score of 74, based on eight reviews. David Jeffries of AllMusic said, "Macklemore's a mix of all of the above with some distinctive qualities, and with Lewis putting that kaleidoscope style underneath, The Heist winds up a rich combination of fresh and familiar."

Adam Fleischer of XXL praised its originality and production, stating "It's these sort of astute observations on the human condition and keen self-awareness that set this effort apart. That reality, coupled with Ryan Lewis' vast, daring and layered production, makes The Heist a truly beautiful album that challenges musical boundaries." Edwin Ortiz of HipHopDX saying the album was "An exemplary balance of serious and cheerful cuts alike, very seldom does The Heist reach beyond its means. And when it does, it's more so due to lack of creative placement than effort." Jody Rosen of Rolling Stone said, "The record has its charms (the single "Thrift Shop", a cheeky ode to second-hand duds) and its virtues (the marriage equality anthem "Same Love"). Unfortunately, Macklemore's virtuousness overwhelms his far more modest charms."

In his Barnes & Noble list, Robert Christgau named The Heist as the seventy-second best album of 2012.

Commercial performance 
The Heist debuted at number two on the Billboard 200 chart, behind only Mumford & Sons's Babel and sold 78,000 copies in its first week, marking the best sales week yet for both Macklemore and Lewis. 83% of the first-week sales derived from digital download. On April 3, 2013, it was announced that the album has reached Gold status, with over 500,000 copies sold. As of February 2016, it has sold 1,490,000 copies domestically. It also debuted at number four on the Canadian Albums Chart.

Track listing
All songs produced by Ryan Lewis.

Credits 

 Macklemore - lead vocals, main artist
 Ryan Lewis - producer, mixing, Electric Piano (track 7)
 Elan Wright - bass (tracks 1, 8, 14)
 Lindsey Starr - backing vocals (track 1)
 Ray Dalton - Vocals (track 2) backing vocals (tracks 2, 11, 15)
 Greg Kramer - Trombone (tracks 2, 5, 17)
 Owuor Arunga - Trumpet (tracks 2, 6, 11, 17) backing vocals (track 18)
 Andrew Joslyn - Violin (tracks 2, 5, 6, 11, 14, 17) backing vocals (track 15) Composer (track 7) Viola (track 11) Percussion (track 11)
 Victoria Fuangaromya  - backing vocals (track 2)
 Tyler Andrews - backing vocals (track 2)
 Camila Recchio backing vocals (track 2, 11)
 Wanz - vocals (track 3)
 DV One - scratches (track 3)
 Buffalo Madonna - vocals (track 4)
 Mary Lambert - vocals (track 5)
 Natalie Hall - Cello (track 5)
 Josh Rawlings - Piano (tracks 5, 8) Electric Piano (track 7)
 Noah Goldberg - Piano (tracks 6, 11, 17) Organ (track 11) Electric Piano (track 7) backing vocals (track 16)
 Seattle Rock Orchestra - Strings (track 7)
 Jeremy Jones - Drums, Percussion (track 8)
 Evan Flory-Barnes - Upright Bass (track 8)
 Josh Karp -  Trumpet (track 8, 14) guitar (track 14) bass (track 16)
 Schoolboy Q - vocals (track 9)
 Hollis - vocals (track 9)
 Ab-Soul - vocals (track 10)
 Zach Fleury - bass (track 11)
 Dana Albaum - Cello (tracks 11, 17)
 Sonny Byers - vocals (track 11)
 Denny Middle School Choir - vocals (track 11)
 Evan Roman - vocals (track 12)
 Eighty4 Fly - vocals (track 13)
 Ben Bridwell - vocals (track 14)
 Mark Isakson - Banjo (track 15)
 Joshua Rule Dobson - Synth (track 16) bass (track 16)

Charts

Weekly charts

Year-end charts

Decade-end charts

Certifications

See also 
 List of Billboard 200 number-one independent albums
 List of Billboard number-one R&B albums of 2012
 List of number-one rap albums of 2012 (U.S.)
 List of number-one albums from the 2010s (New Zealand)
 List of Billboard number-one R&B/hip-hop albums of 2013
 List of Billboard number-one rap albums of 2013
 List of Billboard number-one R&B/hip-hop albums of 2014

References

2012 debut albums
Macklemore albums
Ryan Lewis albums
Self-released albums
Collaborative albums
Grammy Award for Best Rap Album
Albums produced by Ryan Lewis
Warner Music Group albums
West Coast hip hop albums
Pop-rap albums